Timothy James Nicholls (born 6 April 1965) is an Australian politician and a former leader of the Liberal National Party of Queensland. He served as the Treasurer of Queensland and the Minister for Trade of that state between March/April 2012 and 14 February 2015. He is the member for Clayfield in the Legislative Assembly of Queensland. He was originally a member of the Liberal Party including a stint as its deputy leader, but joined the Liberal National Party in 2008 when the Liberal Party and the National Parties merged in Queensland.

Education
Nicholls was educated at Trinity Grammar School in Melbourne and the Anglican Church Grammar School in Brisbane.

He completed a Bachelor of Laws at Queensland University of Technology.

Political career
Nicholls, originally a solicitor, began his career as a councillor in the Hamilton ward of the Brisbane City Council, which he held for six years.  In 2006 he ran as the Liberal candidate in Clayfield. He defeated incumbent member Liddy Clark on 9 September 2006 achieving a swing of 3.2 points.

Shortly after being elected to State Parliament, Nicholls was encouraged by party colleagues to stand against Bruce Flegg for the Liberal Party leadership. He did not initially have enough support in the eight member Liberal caucus.

Shortly after the federal election of 2007, Nicholls again stood against Flegg for leadership. Eventually Mark McArdle was offered as a neutral party and he accepted leadership with Nicholls as his deputy.

The leadership dispute was rendered virtually moot when the Queensland Liberals and Queensland Nationals merged less than a year later to form the Liberal National Party.  Nicholls was appointed Shadow Treasurer by Lawrence Springborg and continued to hold that position in John-Paul Langbroek's Shadow Ministry.

When Campbell Newman stood for the leadership of the party in April 2011, Nicholls supported him and was named interim Deputy Leader of the Opposition.  Newman retained Nicholls as Shadow Treasurer.  After the LNP won the largest majority government in Queensland history at the 2012 state election, Newman named Nicholls as his Treasurer, and he was sworn in on 26 March.

Leader of the LNP (2016–2017)
Following the state election in 2015 which saw the LNP lose government and several difficult months in parliament, Nicholls challenged Lawrence Springborg for the leadership of the party on 6 May 2016, winning the ballot 22 votes to 19. He was the third person from the Liberal side of the merger to hold the post. After the party suffered a three-seat swing at the 2017 state election, Nicholls announced he would stand down as leader of the party.

See also
Shadow ministry of Tim Nicholls

References

External links

 

1965 births
Living people
Members of the Queensland Legislative Assembly
Liberal Party of Australia members of the Parliament of Queensland
Treasurers of Queensland
Liberal National Party of Queensland politicians
Queensland University of Technology alumni
People educated at Trinity Grammar School, Kew
People educated at Anglican Church Grammar School
Australian solicitors
21st-century Australian politicians
Deputy opposition leaders